Kalgoorlie is an electoral district of the Legislative Assembly in the Australian state of Western Australia.

The district includes not only the town of Kalgoorlie, but significant parts of the outback in central and eastern Western Australia.

Long a Labor stronghold, the district was lost to the Liberal Party at the 2001 state election. The new Liberal member, Matt Birney, was re-elected at the 2005 state election but the district has changed hands at every election since then.

History
The district of Kalgoorlie was first created for the 1901 state election and has continued to exist as an electorate ever since. Over its first 100 years it was always represented by the Labor Party with the exception of two interruptions between 1905 and 1911 and 1921 and 1923. For most of the time after 1923, it was a reasonably safe Labor seat.

However, it became far less safe for Labor during the 1990s amid demographic changes in the city of Kalgoorlie. Labor lost the seat in 2001 when Liberal candidate Matt Birney defeated incumbent MP Megan Anwyl at the 2001 state election. Oddly, this was also an election that brought Labor into government. Indeed, Anwyl was the only Labor MP to lose her seat at that election. However, as a measure of how the ground had shifted from under Labor, Anwyl only led Birney by eight votes on the first count, and lost when One Nation preferences flowed overwhelmingly to Birney.

Birney was re-elected at the 2005 state election with a large swing even as the Labor government was convincingly reelected. He retired at the 2008 state election. Upon Birney's retirement, the seat was won by independent candidate and former Labor MLA John Bowler, the former member for Murchison-Eyre. Bowler held the seat for one term before retiring at the 2013 state election when the seat was won by Nationals MLC Wendy Duncan.

Duncan also only held the seat for only one term before retiring ahead of the 2017 state election which allowed Kyran O'Donnell to gain the seat for the Liberal Party. This marked the second time, after the 2001 state election, that the Liberal Party won the seat at an election as it lost government. O'Donnell held the seat for only one term before being swept out by Labor's Ali Kent in 2021 amid the massive Labor wave that swept through Western Australia.

Geography
For most of its history, the seat was a relatively compact seat based on its namesake, the town of Kalgoorlie. A redistribution ahead of the 2008 state election saw a significant expansion of the seat to include remote areas to the north and north-east of the town. This was made necessary by one vote, one value electoral reform which meant that, where previously all non-metropolitan districts could have significantly lower enrolment than their metropolitan (i.e. Perth) counterparts, now the only districts permitted to contain low enrolment are those that cover vast geographical areas. So whilst most of its population is based in the town of Kalgoorlie, the district also includes remote communities such as Eucla, Laverton, Leinster, Leonora and Menzies.

Members for Kalgoorlie

Election results

References

External links
 ABC election profiles: 2005 2008
 WAEC district maps: current boundaries, previous distributions

Kalgoorlie
City of Kalgoorlie–Boulder